Martin Alexander Salmon (born 29 October 1997 in Germersheim) is a German former cyclist, who last rode for UCI WorldTeam . In October 2020, he was named in the startlist for the 2020 Vuelta a España.

Major results
2015
 3rd Road race, National Junior Road Championships
 5th Road race, UCI Junior Road World Championships
 6th Overall GP Général Patton
1st Stage 2
 6th Overall Giro della Lunigiana
2019
 1st  Mountains classification Okolo Slovenska
2020 
 1st  Mountains classification Tour de Limousin

Grand Tour general classification results timeline

References

External links

Martin Salmon at FirstCycling

1997 births
Living people
German male cyclists
People from Germersheim
Cyclists from Rhineland-Palatinate